The Serbian Orthodox Eparchy of Buenos Aires, South and Central America is a Serbian Orthodox Church eparchy (diocese) with the main headquarters located in the city of Buenos Aires, Argentina. The diocese has 20 churches in Argentina, Brazil, Chile, Dominican Republic, Venezuela, Ecuador, El Salvador, Colombia and Peru. On October 13, 2012, was realized the first session of diocese under the rule of the actual administration of Metropolitan bishop Amfilohije Radović. The decision of the Holy Assembly of Bishops of the Serbian Orthodox Church brought in May 2018 elected Kirilo Bojović the first Serbian Bishop of Buenos Aires and South-Central America. He was enthroned in the Cathedral church of Nativity of Virgin in Buenos Aires, Argentina, on 4 September 2018.

For members of Serbian and Montenegrin diaspora in Argentina, Orthodox Christian religion acts as a very significant ethnic symbol. Therefore, as the most important element of social and cultural life the emigrants emphasized existence of Serbian Orthodox Church, since the need for group "survival" (according to the research), throughout history and today, manifested itself through organizing and gathering mostly in the Serbian Orthodox Church and then in homeland's clubs.

See also

Serbian Orthodox Church in North and South America
Serbs in South America
 Diócesis de Buenos Aires, Sudamérica y Centroamérica:La Diócesis de Buenos Aires, Sudamérica y Centroamérica es una de las Diócesis que comprenden la Iglesia Ortodoxa del Patriarcado Serbio y fue creada por el Santo Sínodo de la Iglesia Ortodoxa Serbia en el año 2011. Su Administrador es S. E. R. Metropolitano Amfilohije, Locum Tenens, y el Vicario General es S. E. Obispo Kirilo (Bojovic). Su Sede se encuentra en la Catedral de la Natividad de la Virgen, en la Ciudad Autónoma de Buenos Aires, Argentina. Actualmente la Diócesis cuenta con parroquias y misiones en la Argentina, Brasil, Chile, Colombia, Ecuador, Venezuela, Perú, El Salvador y República Dominicana.

References

Sources

External links
 Serbian Orthodox Eparchy of Buenos Aires and South America

Religious sees of the Serbian Orthodox Church
Serbs in South America
Eastern Orthodoxy in South America
Eastern Orthodox Church bodies in South America
Eastern Orthodox dioceses in Argentina
Buenos Aires